Opsaridium microcephalum is a species of ray-finned fish in the family Cyprinidae found in Malawi, Mozambique, and Tanzania.
Its natural habitats are rivers and freshwater lakes.

References

Opsaridium
Fish described in 1864
Taxa named by Albert Günther
Taxonomy articles created by Polbot